Spearmint Rhino is a chain of strip clubs that operates venues throughout the United States, United Kingdom, and Australia.   The first Spearmint Rhino was located in Upland, California.

Operations
John Gray is the founder & CEO of Spearmint Rhino Consulting Worldwide. His company owns the trademark of Spearmint Rhino Gentlemen's Clubs, Dames N' Games Topless Sports Bars, California Girls Gentlemen's Clubs, Blue Zebra Adult Cabaret and Dirty's Topless Bar. In 2010, the Spearmint Rhino opened 1616 Club, its first non-adult nightclub, in downtown Los Angeles.

Each club location is independently owned, operated and licensed. The company's worldwide headquarters is in Norco, California, US. The London club, in Tottenham Court Road, is the flagship club in the UK.

See also
List of strip clubs
Las Vegas Dancers Alliance

References

External links

Strip clubs
Companies based in Los Angeles County, California
Norco, California
Strip clubs in the United Kingdom
Strip clubs in the United States